Beyond the Edge is an American reality competition television series that premiered on CBS on March 16, 2022. Participants live in the Panamanian jungle of the Bocas del Toro Archipelago for 14 days, and compete as teams to raise money for charitable organizations. A different charity has been chosen by each celebrity. Each participant can opt to leave the competition and go home at any time. At the end of the two weeks, the two stars who have earned the most money for their respective charities face off in a final challenge to determine the top earner, and winner of the competition. The series is hosted by Mauro Ranallo.

The first season concluded on May 18, 2022, with television personality and NFL defensive end Colton Underwood being crowned the winner. In September 2022, the series was canceled after one season.

Contestants

Elimination table

Production
On December 8, 2021, it was announced that CBS had ordered the series. On February 2, 2022, it was announced that the series would premiere on March 16, 2022. The contestants and the host, Mauro Ranallo, were also announced. On September 15, 2022, CBS canceled the series after one season.

Episodes

Reception

References

External links

2020s American game shows
2020s American reality television series
2022 American television series debuts
2022 American television series endings
Adventure reality television series
CBS original programming
Celebrity reality television series
English-language television shows
Reality competition television series
Television shows filmed in Panama
Television shows set in Panama
Television series by Entertainment One